The 1927 European Rowing Championships were rowing championships held on Lake Como in the Italian Lombardy region. The competition was for men only and they competed in all seven Olympic boat classes (M1x, M2x, M2-, M2+, M4-, M4+, M8+).

Medal summary

Footnotes

References

European Rowing Championships
European Rowing Championships
Rowing
Rowing
Rowing competitions in Italy
Como